Siebeck is a surname of German origin. People with this surname include:

Frank Siebeck (born 1949), German athlete
Mark Siebeck (born 1975), German volleyball player
Wolfram Siebeck (1928–2016), German journalist, author and food critic

See also
Mohr Siebeck, a German academic book and journal publisher